Cian Uijtdebroeks (born 28 February 2003) is a Belgian road cyclist, who currently rides for UCI WorldTeam . Uijtdebroeks is considered to be a very promising talent, and has been compared to Remco Evenepoel.

Major results

2020
 1st Kuurne–Brussels–Kuurne Juniors
 9th Time trial, UEC European Junior Road Championships
2021
 1st  Time trial, National Junior Road Championships
 1st  Overall Aubel–Thimister–Stavelot
1st  Mountains classification
1st Stage 2 (TTT)
 1st Grand Prix West Bohemia
 1st La Classique des Alpes Juniors
 2nd  Time trial, UEC European Junior Road Championships
 2nd Overall Ain Bugey Valromey Tour
1st  Mountains classification
1st Stage 2
 2nd Excellenze Valli del Soligo
 2nd Trofeo Guido Dorigo–Solighetto
 3rd Overall Course de la Paix Juniors
1st Stage 2a (ITT)
 6th Time trial, UCI Junior Road World Championships
2022
 1st  Overall Tour de l'Avenir
1st  Mountains classification
1st  Young rider classification
1st Stages 7 & 8
 3rd Overall Sibiu Cycling Tour
1st  Young rider classification
 7th Per sempre Alfredo
 8th Overall Tour of Norway
2023
 9th Overall Tour of Oman

References

External links

2003 births
Living people
Belgian male cyclists